Elliot Caplin (December 25, 1913 - February 20, 2000) was an American comic strip writer best known as the co-creator (with Stan Drake) of The Heart of Juliet Jones. His name is sometimes spelled with one extra letter: Elliott A. Caplin. He was the younger brother of Al Capp, creator of Li'l Abner.

Biography 
Born in New Haven, Connecticut, Caplin graduated from Ohio State University in 1936. Beginning in 1937, he was employed as a writer for King Features Syndicate. He entered the comic book field as editor of True Comics for the Parents Magazine Institute. By 1940, he was an editorial director with the magazine Parents, leaving during World War II to serve with the Navy in the South Pacific. In the post-World War II years, he returned to Parents, continuing as an editor there until 1948.

Caplin co-created the strips Dr. Bobbs, Peter Scratch, and Big Ben Bolt, and served as writer for strips by others, including Abbie an' Slats, Long Sam, and Little Orphan Annie. He adapted author Donald J. Sobol's Encyclopedia Brown series into a comic strip.

He founded the comic book publisher Toby Press, which operated from 1949 to 1955.

Theater
In the early 1970s, Caplin wrote Meegan’s Game, a play about arrested adolescence. Directed by Paul E. Davis, it had a 1974 workshop production for several weekends at the Cricket Theatre on Second Avenue in an effort to interest potential backers. The play was eventually produced in 1982.  Among his many other plays are A Nickel for Picasso, a fictionalized account of his brother losing his leg.  He also wrote a book about his brother, Al Capp Remembered.

Personal life and death 
Caplin lived in Larchmont, New York, with his wife Ruth and their three children, Donald, Joan and Toby. He died in Stockbridge, Massachusetts, in 2000.

References

External links
Al Capp Remembered by Elliott Caplin (Bowling Green University Press, 1994)

1913 births
2000 deaths
American comics writers
People from Stockbridge, Massachusetts